Sailesh Kolanu is an Indian film director and screenwriter who predominantly works in Telugu cinema.

Early life and family 
Sailesh was born and raised in Chennai, Tamil Nadu, since his father used to work as a production manager for late filmmaker, Kodi Ramakrishna. He graduated from the Bausch and Lomb School of Optometry of Birla Institute of Technology and Science, Pilani – Hyderabad Campus. He further pursued his PhD, in optometry, from the University of New South Wales, before pursuing a career as a filmmaker.

Career 
Kolanu began his career with the 2018 short film, Checklist, which was made for I F P's 50 hour filmmaking challenge. He went on to direct his first feature film, HIT: The First Case, produced by Nani. It was a box-office success and was subsequently remade in Hindi, in 2022, with the exact same name, starring Rajkummar Rao and Sanya Malhotra. He went on to create the HIT Universe, successfully making the second film of the franchise, HIT: The Second Case. He announced HIT: The Third Case, during the mid-credits scene of HIT: The Second Case, starring Nani.

Filmography

References

External links 
 

1986 births
Living people
Telugu film directors
Indian male screenwriters
Telugu screenwriters
21st-century Indian dramatists and playwrights
21st-century Indian film directors
Film directors from Andhra Pradesh
Screenwriters from Andhra Pradesh
21st-century Indian screenwriters